Swami Tapasyananda (1904-1991) was a senior monk of the Ramakrishna Mission. He was born in family of Ottapalam in Kerala, in 1904. His pre-monastic name was K. P. Balakrishnan Menon. In 1921, when he was just 17 years old, he met Swami Brahmananda- a direct disciple and spiritual son of Sri Ramakrishna, in Chennai. He received Mantra-Diksha from Swami Shivananda in 1924, and joined the Order in 1926, at 22 years age after completing in post graduation. In 1932, he received Sannyasa from Swami Shivananda. He was a disciple of Swami Shivananda, one of the eminent disciples of Sri Ramakrishna. The Swami was a vice-president of the Ramakrishna Order from 1985-1991, giving Mantra-Diksha to a large number of devotees. He was an erudite scholar in Indian and Western philosophy. He has to his credit many books in English, including the translations of many scriptures. His translation of Bhagavata Purana in four volumes has been highly acclaimed in intellectual and devotional circles. He was the president of Ramakrishna Math, Chennai from 1971-1991. Swamiji was well known for his austere life and intuitive intellect. His deity was Lord Khrishna and he practiced spritual activity as told by his Guruji, but his Guruji was not a complete Saint/Swami who was authorised by almighty to give naam diksha . He was a prolific writer. Some of the books authored by him are listed below. He translated many Hindu classics into English from original Sanskrit. He founded Ramakrishna Mission Hospital at Thiruvananthapuram.

Bibliography

Biographies 
 Sri Ramakrishna: Life and Teachings 
 Sri Sarada Devi: Life and Teachings
 Swami Vivekananda: His Life and Legacy
 Sri Sarada Devi, The Holy Mother
 Swami Ramakrishnananda : the apostle of Sri Ramakrishna to the South

Studies 
 Bhakti Schools of Vedanta 
 The four yogas of Swami Vivekananda 
 The Nationalistic and Religious Lectures of Swami Vivekananda
 The philosophical and religious lectures of Swami Vivekananda
 For Enquirers about Ramakrishna Math and Mission
 Spiritual Quest
 Sri Ramakrishna's Thought on Man, World and God

Translations 
 Srimad Bhagavata; The Holy Book of God - 4 volumes (Original Sanskrit with English Translation) 
 Srimad Bhagavad Gita (Economy Edition)
 Bhagavad Gita (Pocket Edition)
 Adhyatma Ramayana: The Spiritual Version of the Rama Saga (Original Sanskrit with English Translation) 
 Sundarakandam of Srimad Valmiki Ramayana 
 Narayaneeyam : Bhagavata condensed 
 Bhakti ratnavali, or, A necklace of devotional gems : an anthology from Bhagavata 
 Sri Vishnu Sahasranama as per Shankara's commentary
 Sri Lalita Sahasranama: The Text, Transliteration and English Translation 
 Saundarya-lahari of Sri Sankaracarya : with text and translation, and notes based on Laksmidhara's commentary 
 Sivananda Lahari of Shankara
 Aratrika Hymns and Ramnam
 Stotranjali
 Sankara Digvijaya
 Kaplilopadesha
 Prashnottara-ratna-malika of Shankara
 Laghu-Vasudeva-Mananam

Notes

  "Debate between Sankara and Mandana Misra",  "By Swami Tapasyananda"
  "Bhagavad Gita Summary (Swami Tapasyananda)"
  "Swami Tapasyananda : Austerity Personified

Further reading
 Swami Tapasyananda As We Knew Him. Ramakrishna Math, Chennai, 2013. 

1904 births
1991 deaths
Indian male writers
Hindu writers
Monks of the Ramakrishna Mission
Translators of the Bhagavad Gita